Sub rosa is a Latin phrase connoting secrecy.

Sub rosa or subrosa may also refer to:

Arts, media, and entertainment
 Sub Rosa (band), a Brazilian rock band
 Subrosa (band), an American alternative rock band
 Sub Rosa (album), a 2003 album by Eagle-Eye Cherry
 Sub Rosa, a 2007 album by the band Mirabilis
 Sub Rosa (novel), a 2010 novel by Canadian writer Amber Dawn
 Roma Sub Rosa, a series of mystery novels by Steven Saylor set in ancient Rome
 "Sub Rosa" (Star Trek: The Next Generation), an episode of Star Trek: The Next Generation
 Sub Rosa (NCIS), an episode of the television series NCIS
 Sub Rosa (video game), an online video game by Devolver Digital

Other uses
 Sub Rosa, a summer house on the Lindenshade farm in Wallingford, Pennsylvania
 Sub Rosa (company), an American design studio
 Sub Rosa (label), a Belgian music label
 Sub Rosa (Pocahontas, Mississippi), a historic mansion in Pocahontas, Mississippi
 Sub Rosa, Arkansas, a ghost town
 Sub Rosa, NZIC Association, the New Zealand Intelligence Corps association
 subRosa, a cyberfeminist art collective